Tom Wentao Lin (born ) is an American novelist. His debut novel, The Thousand Crimes of Ming Tsu, a Western about a Chinese American outlaw, was published by Little, Brown and Company in 2021 and won the 2022 Andrew Carnegie Medal for Excellence in Fiction.

Early life and education
Lin was born in Beijing, China, and moved to Flushing, Queens, New York City with his family when he was four. He attended Pomona College. , he is pursuing a doctorate in English at the University of California, Davis.

Career
Lin's debut novel, The Thousand Crimes of Ming Tsu, was published by Little, Brown and Company on June 1, 2021. It is a Western with supernatural elements set in the 1860s about a Chinese American assassin who pursues vengeance after railroad barons kidnap his lover and conscript him into helping construct the Central Pacific Railroad. Media praised the story's subversion of the white-centric perspective of traditional westerns and its exploration of identity. The novel was awarded the 2022 Andrew Carnegie Medal for Excellence in Fiction, making Lin the youngest Carnegie winner.

Works

References

External links

American people of Chinese descent
People from Beijing
People from Flushing, Queens
Pomona College alumni
University of California, Davis alumni
1990s births
Living people